Guy Ferri (July 7, 1922 – 1991) was a United States diplomat and United Nations official who served as a State Department foreign service officer from 1954–1972 and as the deputy representative of the International Atomic Energy Agency to the United Nations from 1972 to 1983.

Early life
Born as Gaetano Ferri in Loreto Aprutino, Italy on July 7, 1922 to Assunta and Pasquale Ferri.  The Ferri family immigrated to the United States when he was a young child and settled in Hamburg, Pennsylvania.

Military career
Upon completion of high school in Hamburg, Ferri then served in the United States Army as a sergeant in North Africa and Europe during World War II and later served as a captain in the United States Air Force Reserve. Ferri completed his undergraduate studies at Georgetown University's Edmund A. Walsh School of Foreign Service and earned a master's degree in Public Administration from Harvard University.  He married Teresa Bursley in 1955.

Political career
During his career as a foreign service officer with the State Department he was stationed with his family in numerous United States embassies including Buenos Aires; Saigon, South Vietnam, and Asuncion, Paraguay, as well as a multitude of assignments in Washington D.C.  He was fluent in English, Italian, Spanish, and French.

Ferri resided in Rye, NY during his time as deputy representative of the International Atomic Energy Agency to the United Nations and then retired with his wife to Palm Coast, Florida.

References 

American officials of the United Nations
American diplomats
International Atomic Energy Agency officials
1922 births
1991 deaths
People from Palm Coast, Florida
Harvard Kennedy School alumni
Walsh School of Foreign Service alumni
United States Foreign Service personnel
United States Air Force reservists
United States Army personnel of World War II
Italian emigrants to the United States
American expatriates in Argentina
American expatriates in Vietnam
American expatriates in Paraguay